= Globostomia pervicax =

Scientific classification
- Kingdom: Animalia
- Phylum: Mollusca
- Class: Gastropoda
- Family: Pyramidellidae
- Genus: Globostomia
- Species: G. pervicax

Binomial name
- Globostomia pervicax Hoffman, van Heugten & Lavaleye, 2009

Species of gastropod

Globostomia pervicax is a species of sea snail, a marine gastropod mollusc in the family Pyramidellidae, the pyrams and their allies.
