= Globostomia =

Scientific classification
- Kingdom: Animalia
- Phylum: Mollusca
- Class: Gastropoda
- Family: Pyramidellidae
- Genus: Globostomia; Hoffman, van Heugten & Lavaleye, 2009

Genus of gastropods

Globostomia is a genus of sea snails, marine gastropod mollusks in the family Pyramidellidae, the pyrams and their allies.

== Species ==
Species within the genus Globostomia include:

- Globostomia pervicax Hoffman, van Heugten & Lavaleye, 2009
